John Dawson Rawdon (1804 – 5 May 1866) was an Irish Whig politician and army officer.

Rawdon also attained the army ranks of Lieutenant Colonel and Colonel and, in 1828, married Lady Dowager Cremorne.

References

External links
 

UK MPs 1837–1841
UK MPs 1841–1847
UK MPs 1847–1852
Whig (British political party) MPs for Irish constituencies
1804 births
1866 deaths